Richard Curran (18 November 1879 – 27 January 1961) was an Irish politician. A farmer, he was first elected to Dáil Éireann at the 1933 general election as a National Centre Party Teachta Dála (TD) for the Tipperary constituency. He became a Fine Gael TD on 8 September 1933 when Cumann na nGaedheal and the National Centre Party, along with the Army Comrades Association merged to form the new party of Fine Gael. He lost his seat at the 1937 general election but was elected as a Fine Gael TD at the 1938 general election. He lost his seat at the 1943 general election.

References

1879 births
1961 deaths
National Centre Party (Ireland) TDs
Fine Gael TDs
Members of the 8th Dáil
Members of the 10th Dáil
Politicians from County Tipperary
Irish farmers